Perucho may refer to:

People
Perucho Figueredo (1818 – 1870), Cuban poet, composer and revolutionary
Pedro González González (1893 – 1940), Spanish politician
Artur Perucho Badia (1902 – 1956), Spanish journalist
Pedro Cepeda (1905 – 1955), Puerto Rican baseball player
Pedro Petrone (1905 – 1964), Uruguayan footballer
Joan Perucho (1920 – 2003), Spanish writer
Pedro Rincón Gutiérrez (1923 – 2004), Venezuelan doctor, academic and politician
Perucho Conde (born 1934), Venezuelan comedian
Manuel Perucho (born 1948), Spanish scientist
Carlos Pérez (kayaker) (born 1979), Spanish sprint canoer

Places
Perucho, Quito, parish in Quito, Ecuador

Spanish-language hypocorisms